The Europe Theatre Prize (Premio Europa per il Teatro) is an award of the European Commission for a personality who has "contributed to the realisation of cultural events that promote understanding and the exchange of knowledge between peoples". "The winner is chosen for the whole of his artistic path among notable personalities of international theatre considered in all its different forms, articulations and expressions". The prize was established in 1986 when Carlo Ripa di Meana was first Commissioner of Culture. In those years a contribution to its creation also came from Melina Mercouri, who was patroness of the Prize, and from Jack Lang, then French Minister of Culture and current President of the Prize. The European Parliament and the European Council have supported it as a "European cultural interest organisation" since 2002.

In 1987 the prize was first awarded to Ariane Mnouchkine for her work with the Théâtre du Soleil. She received a money prize and a sculpture of Pietro Consagra. The first international jury was chaired by Irene Papas. Recipients have included choreographer Pina Bausch and stage director Patrice Chéreau.

In 1990, an additional award Europe Prize Theatrical Realities (Premio Europa Realtà Teatrali) was established looking at innovation in theatre and first awarded to Anatoly Vasiliev. In Edition XII, they were Viliam Dočolomanský (Slovakia), Katie Mitchell (United Kingdom), Andrey Moguchy (Russia), Kristian Smeds (Finland), Teatro Meridional (Portugal) and Vesturport (Iceland). Recipients have also included Heiner Goebbels, Oskaras Koršunovas (2002) and Rimini Protokoll (2008).

The program for both awards is rich in theatrical presentations. Lasting a week, it has been termed the "'Oscars' of European theatre" and "Oscar of Drama".

History of the Prize
The first nine editions of the prize were awarded in Taormina. To achieve a more international aspect it became itinerant, so the ceremonies were held in Turin for Edition X, as part of the cultural program for the 2006 Winter Olympics in collaboration with the Teatro Stabile. Editions XI and XII were held in Thessaloniki, Greece, Edition XIII in Wrocław, Poland, as part of the UNESCO's Grotowski Year.

In 2011 the awards were given at the Alexandrinsky Theatre of St. Petersburg, then Culture Capital of Russia. A critic described the performances of innovative theatre: "Their shows demonstrate that the dialogue between the arts and cutting edge technology opens up new ways towards creation and knowledge. Computer generated images, pantomime, dancing, circus and music expand the frontiers of the theatre and make it more dramatic. Shows such as Faustus based on Goethe's play, Metamorphosis by Kafka, Mr Vertigo by Paul Auster, Cabo Verde by Natalia Luiza and Miguel Seabra, and Happiness by Maurice Maeternlick are overwhelming both in their use of technique and the emotions they exude."

In 2016, the Edition XV was presented in Craiova, Romania, following the prestigious International Shakespeare Festival, which reached its 10th edition in the 400th anniversary of Shakespeare’s death on April 23. This edition of the Prize was organised under the patronage of the City of Craiova, which wanted to unite the two events, in cooperation with the Shakespeare Foundation and the city’s National Theatre ‘Marin Sorescu’, to which can be added the contribution of the Romanian Cultural Institute.

In 2017, the Prize returned for the Edition XVI to Italy, in Rome, as a special project promoted by the Minister of Culture, as both an ideal conclusion to the 60th anniversary of the Treaties of Rome and the opening event of the European Year of Cultural Heritage 2018. These celebrations coincided with the 30th anniversary of the Prize itself, the first cultural initiative launched by the European Commmunity in the field of theatre. The 16th Prize was given to two emblematic figures of the international stage: Isabelle Huppert and Jeremy Irons, artists capable of transferring the theatrical dimension to that of cinema and vice-versa so that the Prize went once again to actors, after Michel Piccoli’s 2001 award of the 9th Prize. The ceremony finished with a staged reading of Harold Pinter’s Ashes to Ashes, masterfully performed by Huppert and Irons, who have been defined by The Guardian 'theatrical dynamite'.

In November 2018, the Europe Theatre Prize returned for the second time to St. Petersburg, Russia, thanks to the support and patronage of the Ministry of Culture of the Russian Federation and the City Government, and was included in the VII "St. Petersburg International Cultural Forum" as a flagship event among theatrical events. The Baltic House Theatre-Festival of St. Petersburg presented the Edition XVII of the Prize, collaborated in the realization of the event, supported and organized it in Russia, as well as hosting various scheduled performances. With its return to Russia as part of the VII Cultural Forum, the Prize once again served as a bridge that uses theatre and art to connect and encourage dialogue across geographical, cultural, political and social differences.

List of recipients

Publications 
In addition to the publication of a catalogue for every Prize edition, a series of volumes hosts the proceedings of meetings of the various editions with testimonies on the profiles and works of the winners and the proceedings of the collateral initiatives of the Prize events.

References

Sources
 https://www.premioeuropa.org/
 

Awards established in 1986
Theatre
International theatre awards